William Ronckendorff (9 November 1812 in Philadelphia, Pennsylvania – 27 November 1891 in New York City) was an officer in the United States Navy.

Biography
He entered the Navy, became passed midshipman on 23 June 1838, was commissioned lieutenant on 28 June 1843, and in June 1845 was bearer of despatches to the commander-in-chief of the Pacific Squadron, with which he served during the war with Mexico. He was in the Savannah at the capture and occupation of Monterey and points on the coast of California, and returned to New York in September 1847.

He commanded the steamer M. W. Chapin in the Paraguay expedition of 1859 and on coast survey duty in 1860, was commissioned commander, 29 June 1861, and had charge of the steamer Water Witch from 1 March until 12 October 1861, in the Gulf Squadron. On 27 December 1861, he took command of the steamer San Jacinto, with which he was present in Hampton Roads to fight the Merrimac, and participated in the attack on Sewell's Point, 15 May 1862, and in the capture of Norfolk on 18 May. He was in the Ticonderoga, searching for privateers in 1863, and in February 1864 he commanded the monitor Monadnock in operations in James River until the evacuation of Richmond, when he cruised to Havana in search of the Stonewall.

In July 1865, he was transferred to the monitor Tonawanda. He was commissioned captain, 27 September 1866, and was at Philadelphia until 1 October 1870, when he took charge of the ironclads at New Orleans until 8 April 1872. He commanded the steamer Canandaigua, of the North Atlantic Squadron, in 1872–73, was promoted to commodore on 12 September 1874, and was placed on the retired list on 9 November 1874, by reason of his age.

He died on November 27, 1891 in New York City and was interred at Laurel Hill Cemetery in Philadelphia.

References

1812 births
1891 deaths
Burials at Laurel Hill Cemetery (Philadelphia)
United States Navy officers
People of Pennsylvania in the American Civil War
United States Navy personnel of the Mexican–American War
Military personnel from Philadelphia